Ondref Krajnak is a Slovakian musician.

Early life 
Krajnak was born on March 1, 1978, in Levice, Slovakia. He came from a musical family. At six, he was already playing classical music and participating in various competitions for young talents. At age ten he heard jazz for the first time. Krajnak became so fascinated by this new form of music that, in the same year, he participated in a young jazz artist competition- Jazz Fest Zilina, where he was awarded the 'Discovery of the year'.

When Krajnak was 14, he began to study at the Erkel Ferenc Jazz Academy in Budapest (HUN) under Robert Ratonyi. During this period he participated in various musical competitions in Europe, such as a jazz contest in Poland, where he won a special award, and a piano contest in Hungary, where he was awarded best artist in the category “solo piano”. After graduation he obtained a scholarship at the Berklee College of Music in Boston, which he rejected to start his active career.

Career 
He established himself on the European jazz scene. He has recorded over 40 albums and performed at concerts all over the world.

Selected musical collaborations 
 Elements duo with Radovan Tariska
 One with Oto Hejnic Trio 
 Standards (One) with Oto Hejnic Trio
 Forevernest solo piano album
 Radovan Tariska Sextet
 Partnership Unlimited with Oskar Rozsa
 What´s outside with Stveracek Quartet 
 Jazz at Prague Castle with Ondrej Stveracek
 When I Fall in Love with Oľga Skrancova 
 Reflections of My Soul with Hanka Gregušová 
 Essence with Hanka Gregušová
 Aven Bachtale with Ida Kelarova
 Sumen Savore with Ida Kelarova
 Ethno Fest with Ida Kelarova
 Ida Kelarova and Iva Bittova sings Jazz
 Marija Panna Precista with Zuzana Lapcikova
 Orbis Pictus with Zuzana Lapcikova
 Rozchody, Navraty with Zuzana Lapcikova
 Slovak Jazz Trio with Dodo Sosoka
 Three Pianos with Ľubomír Sramek and Klaudius Kovac
 Hot House with Juraj Bartos

References

Slovak jazz musicians
Jazz pianists
1978 births
Living people
21st-century pianists